Tiau River (or Tio river) a  long river which forms part of the international boundary between India and Myanmar.

It rises near Khuangphah village of Champhai district in Mizoram, India. It ultimately merges with the Tuipui River.

Zokhawthar is located on the Indian side of the river. The Tio Khawmawi village is located on the Burmese side. In the local language, the river is also known as Ciau River or Ciau Guun ("Guun" means river).

References 

Rivers of Manipur
Rivers of Myanmar
Rivers of Mizoram
Rivers of India